Kamayestan (also Romanized as Kamāyestān and Komāyestān; also known as Kumīsdān) is a village in Bala Jowayin Rural District, in the Central District of Jowayin County, Razavi Khorasan Province, Iran. At the 2006 census, its population was 553, in 141 families.

References 

Populated places in Joveyn County